Galen W. Higdon (born May 30, 1954) is an American politician. He is a former member of the Missouri House of Representatives from the 11th district, having served from 2011 to 2019. He is a member of the Republican Party.

References

1954 births
21st-century American politicians
Living people
Republican Party members of the Missouri House of Representatives
Politicians from St. Joseph, Missouri